Another Version of the Truth was an independently released live concert video documenting Nine Inch Nails'  2008 Lights in the Sky tour made available throughout late 2009/early 2010 on Blu-ray, DVD, and various other online formats. Another Version of the Truth is also the title of an instrumental track on Nine Inch Nails' 2007 album Year Zero. The video is a 3-disc set bringing together numerous editors, designers, and web programmers to create a professional digital film, followed by a physical release created "by fans for fans".

The project is supposed to be "strictly not for profit" and shared for free.

Background
This One Is On Us  is a global multimedia organization that inspires the public to document, and create lasting mementos of their live music experience.

Nine Inch Nails frontman Trent Reznor had originally intended to film the entirety of three shows of the Lights in the Sky Tour in 3-D, using James Cameron's 3-D team, for release on what would have been the act's last live album. Due to Interscope Records pulling out at the last minute, the project could not be completed., and thus This One Is On Us decided to create its own single DVD release of the band's final performance in Las Vegas on December 13, 2009. However, footage of over 400 GB worth of video from the band's following shows in Victoria (December 5), Portland (December 7), and Sacramento (December 12) was nevertheless shot by "a mysterious, shadowy group of subversives" and unofficially distributed via BitTorrent on January 7, 2009 as a Christmas/New Year gift from Reznor to fans for them to do as they wished. In an immediate response to Reznor's announcement of his abandoned project, This One Is On Us quickly downloaded the data and had begun to assemble the footage into a full-length concert film, to twin with the previously made Vegas disc. After a round of voting, Another Version of the Truth was chosen to be the project title. continuing the tradition of naming Nine Inch Nails concert videos after a certain song for its associated album (And All That Could Have Been, and Beside You in Time).

While this particular project was well underway for a year, the group also worked on several other releases in the meantime, including The Downward Spiral: Live, a very popular release documenting of the first out of two ever live performances of The Downward Spiral in its entirety, played on August 23, 2009, at Webster Hall in New York City. This specific project earned the group the attention of the band members themselves, who all tweeted about the release, impressed by its quality. The band's art director Rob Sheridan also posted about it on the official Nine Inch Nails website on October 23, 2010.

Las Vegas
Filmed entirely by fans, this release saw the community fly in from around the world, donate technology, skill, and even airfare to document the final performance of Nine Inch Nails' 2008 tour. Over 200GB of audience-recorded footage was collected, which was meticulously edited together by a team of people from all over the world. The video was released to the public as a free digital download in variety of formats including DVD and iPod (MP4).

This particular show is notable for being the final Nine Inch Nails performance with drummer Josh Freese.

The Gift
Filmed in Victoria, Portland, and Sacramento by the Nine Inch Nails team, edited and produced by their fans, The Gift is presented in 1080p high-definition video with 5.1 surround sound, multi-language subtitles, and artistically-driven ethics. The video was released to the public as a free digital download in variety of formats including Blu-ray, DVD, MOV, and iPod (MP4).

Bonus content
This release includes:

 Making-of featurettes donated by Moment Factory (the company and crew responsible for the Lights in the Sky technology).
 Exclusive rehearsal footage, and alternate visuals to several performances.
 Rarely performed songs from the US and South America including 32 Ghosts IV and "Down in It" (much of this material comes from the makers of other fan-made releases The Downward Spiral: Live, After All This Time (Live in Chile), and Your World On Fire (Live in Kansas City).)
 A photo slideshow of the images donated by fans via Flickr, this also features the remix In This Twilight - Guild Remix by Samuel Trim (Bosley Beats) and Richard Evans II of Guild.
 Highlights of Internet coverage from the era, including an Echoplex Drum Simulator and Trent Vanegas's end-of-tour interview with Reznor.
(Approximate running time for bonus material is 3 hours. Due to the variety of sources for this disc, video quality ranges from high to low resolution depending on the feature.)

Promotion and release

On December 18, the group released the final trailer for Another Version of the Truth. It was then released as three separate torrents (including PDFs) respectively on December 25, 2009, January 25, 2010 and February 25, 2010, followed by an eventual physical release in June 2010.

The initial 3-disc physical set included a 16-page booklet (including credits and project documentation), and a themed sticker and postcard. Initial demand for the 3-disc configuration far exceeded supply and the original run of 5,000 sets quickly sold out by October. In response, an affordable, single disc version (housed in a six-panel digipak), solely focusing on the band released, fan edited show (The Gift) in both DVD and Blu-ray formats is readily available.

In early December 2013, This One Is On Us announced a "limited quantity" repressing of the 3-disc set as a triple DVD digipak, which is the first time the 3-disc set has been available together and the bonus disc has been available in a non-download "pressed" format since the initial first pressing release in June 2010.

Reception
To date, the group and the project has received significant attention from media outlets such as USA Today, Rolling Stone, Techdirt and Pitchfork TV, and holds the support of both the band and its fan community with theatrical screenings being held all over the world. Sheridan noted that "this is yet another example of a devoted fanbase and a policy of openness combining to fill in blanks left by old media barriers. The entire NIN camp is absolutely thrilled that treating our fans with respect and nurturing their creativity has led to such an overwhelming outpour of incredible content, and that we now have such a high quality souvenir from our most ambitious tour ever," whilst Reznor simply tweeted "Nine Inch Nails fans kick ass. Blown away."

Track listing

Vegas

Gift

Personnel
 Trent Reznor – lead vocals, guitar, keyboard, marimba, tambourine
 Robin Finck – guitar, banjo, recorder, backing vocals
 Justin Meldal-Johnsen – bass guitar, guitar, keyboard, backing vocals
 Alessandro Cortini – keyboard, synthesizer, programming, guitar, backing vocals
 Josh Freese – Acoustic/Electronic & "Found Object" (for the "Ghosts" section of the show, exampled by using empty water cooler jugs as toms) drums

References

External links
Official This One Is On Us website
This One Is On Us at the NinWiki

Nine Inch Nails live albums
2009 live albums
2009 video albums
Albums free for download by copyright owner
Concert films
Live video albums
Self-released albums